Saint-Calixte is a municipality and town in the Lanaudière region of Quebec, Canada, part of the Montcalm Regional County Municipality. Its proximity to the city of Montreal, and its natural environment, make Saint-Calixte a destination for camping in the summertime. There are also many cottages that surround the many lakes in the region. In 2013, Quebec's largest amusement/camping site, Camping et parc d'amusement Atlantide, a 10 million dollar investment, opened its doors in the municipality. The development of the theme park and camping site is arising hopes of new development in Saint-Calixte.

History
In 1845, the place was first incorporated as the Municipality of Saint-Lin by separating from the Parish Municipality of Saint-Lin (now Saint-Lin-Laurentides), but abolished two years later.

In 1851, the Saint-Calixte Mission was formed, named after Pope Callixtus I. In 1855, the municipality was reestablished as the Township Municipality of Kilkenny, taking the name of the geographic township in which it is located (the township was formed in 1832 and named after a city and county in Ireland). A year later in 1856, the post office opened, bearing the name Saint-Calixte-de-Kilkenny since 1877. In 1954, the municipality was renamed to its current name.

The Lac Dodon meteorite was found near the town in 1993.

Camping et parc d'amusement Atlantide
In 2011, two investors from Terrebonne, Quebec decided to invest 10 million dollars to build a theme park, and camping site in the province of Quebec. After a number of years of planning, they chose Saint-Calixte as the location of the park, and purchased a 5 million square feet property in the municipality. After more than a year of construction, the first phase of the park opened in summer 2013, with over 300 camping spaces available, and a water park, as well as playgrounds. Two other expansion phases are planned for 2014 and 2015, which are planned to increase the capacity of the park and camping ground to 2000 spaces, with an artificial lake and beach, as well as a convenience store.

Demographics

Private dwellings occupied by usual residents: 3149 (total dwellings: 3791)

Mother tongue:
 English as first language: 2.6%
 French as first language: 93.2%
 English and French as first language: 1.4%
 Other as first language: 2.4%

Education

Commission scolaire des Samares operates Francophone public schools:
 École Louis-Joseph-Martel — de la Gentiane
 pavillon de la Gentiane
 pavillon Louis-Joseph-Martel

Sir Wilfrid Laurier School Board operates Anglophone public schools:
 Rawdon Elementary School in Rawdon serves St. Calixte Village
 Joliette Elementary School in Saint-Charles-Borromée serves the township
 Joliette High School in Joliette serves all of Saint-Calixte

References

Incorporated places in Lanaudière
Municipalities in Quebec